Kathryn Elsbeth Erbe (born July 5, 1965) is an American actress. She is best known for her role as Alexandra Eames on Law & Order: Criminal Intent, a spin-off of Law & Order,  and Shirley Bellinger in the HBO series Oz.

Early life
Erbe was born in Newton, Massachusetts, the daughter of Elsbeth and Richard Erbe. Her father is a research geneticist. She graduated from New York University (NYU) in 1989.

Career
While an undergraduate student at NYU, Erbe was cast as the daughter of Lynn Redgrave's character on the sitcom Chicken Soup. She later became a member of Steppenwolf Theatre Company and has starred in many of their productions, including A Streetcar Named Desire, Curse of the Starving Class, and The Grapes of Wrath, which ran for six months and won the 1990 Tony Award for Best Play. Erbe earned a Tony Award nomination in 1991 for her portrayal of Mary in The Speed of Darkness.

Erbe starred in such films as What About Bob?, Stir of Echoes, Rich in Love, and the independent films Dream with the Fishes, Love from Ground Zero, and Entropy. She played opposite David Caruso in Kiss of Death. She portrayed Shirley Bellinger on the HBO series Oz, including a scene in which she did full frontal nudity, to critical acclaim.Same thing in the movie "Dream With The Fishes".  She made a guest appearance on Homicide: Life on the Street in 1997. From 2001 to early 2010, she starred as Detective Alexandra Eames on the NBC/USA Network series Law & Order: Criminal Intent, alongside Vincent D'Onofrio.

In 2010, both Erbe and D'Onofrio left Criminal Intent. Erbe signed on to reprise the role of Detective Eames for the eight-episode final season of the series, joining Vincent D'Onofrio, who had already signed up to return as Detective Robert Goren. She has reprised the role in guest appearances on Law & Order: Special Victims Unit. In 2014, Erbe appeared in an episode of Last Week Tonight parodying her role on Law & Order: Criminal Intent. She also recently played Fay Ambrose, the wife of Detective Harry Ambrose, in the USA Network's The Sinner.

Personal life
Erbe was married to actor Terry Kinney, who also starred in Oz, from 1993 until their divorce in 2006. Together they have two children, a daughter, Maeve, and a son, Carson.

Filmography

Film

Television

Theatre

References

External links

People from Newton, Massachusetts
20th-century American actresses
21st-century American actresses
Actresses from Boston
Actresses from Massachusetts
American film actresses
American stage actresses
American television actresses
Lee Strasberg Theatre and Film Institute alumni
Living people
Tisch School of the Arts alumni
Steppenwolf Theatre Company players
1965 births